Aholibamah (Hebrew:  ʾĀhŏlīḇāmā; "My tabernacle of/is height/exaltation" or "Tent of the High Place"), is an eight-time referenced matriarch in the biblical record.

Aholibamah (a descendant of Ishmael) was the daughter of Anah of Zibeon the Hivite. Her maternal grandfather was Zibeon the Hivite, son of Seir the Horite. She was one of two Canaanite women who married Esau, the son of Isaac, when he was in his forties. Isaac and his wife Rebecca, however, were greatly opposed to this union. So, according to some Biblical scholars, Esau changed her name to the Hebrew name "Judith", as to pacify his parents.

Biblical scholars have thus conciliated the two different name accounts given in Genesis for the three wives of Esau:

 Basemath (Genesis 26:34–35) = Adah (Genesis 36:2,3), the daughter of Elon the Hittite;
 Judith (Genesis 26:34–35) = Aholibamah (Genesis 36:2,3), also a Canaanite;
 Mahalath (Genesis 26:34–35) = Bashemath (Genesis 36:2,3), Esau's cousin and third wife, daughter of Ishmael.

The name Aholibamah appears again later among the listed clans of Edom, suggesting that a descendant of Esau had the same (female) name and became a chief.

In popular culture 
In the fantasy novel Many Waters by Madeleine L'Engle, Oholibamah was the daughter of a nephil (fallen angel). She married into the family of Noah. 

In The Red Tent, Oholibamah is mentioned as having died in childbirth, leaving only Adath and Basemath, both bitter rivals for Esau's affections.

References

Book of Genesis people
Esau
Women in the Hebrew Bible